Hleoheng is a community council located in the Leribe District of Lesotho. Its population in 2006 was 27,576.

Villages
The community of Hleoheng includes the villages of

Ha AkabeHa Barete (St Monicas)Ha Jeremia (St Monicas)Ha LekepetsiHa Lekepetsi (Likhetlane)Ha LepamoHa Litsoako (Ha Maqele)Ha MafataHa MakoanyaneHa MaqeleHa MashaphaHa Matasane

Ha Matau (St Monicas)Ha MathapolaneHa MatumoHa MokatiHa MongaliHa MothamahaneHa Mpotle (Mpharane)Ha Ntebele (Likhetlane)Ha NyenyeHa Nyenye (Korosong)Ha Nyenye (Likoting)Ha Phatsoane

Ha PolakiHa QamoHa RalikukuHa RamorutiHa RapetlonyaneHa SeneiHa Sepinare (Likhetlane)Ha SethubathaHa TaemaneHa Takalimane (Likhetlane)Ha TumoHleoheng

Likotjaneng (Hleoheng)Linoheng (Mpharane)Lipeleng (Mpharane)Mafika-LisiuMahabalibakaMohalalitoe (Ha Nyenye)Ntsirele (Hleoheng)Phukalla (Ha Nyenye)QetsolaneSerutleTlapanengTšoeneng (Mpharane)

References

External links
 Google map of community villages

Populated places in Leribe District